Bianca Amato is a South African actress known for her work in American theatre, as a prolific audiobook performer and for her portrayal of Philippa De Villiers in the original cast of the South African soap opera Isidingo.

Career
Amato was a member of the original cast of the long running South African soap opera Isidingo, portraying Philippa De Villiers from 1998 to 2001. The role, a "feisty young Englishwoman who was romantically involved with a black mine manager", has been called "groundbreaking and big news in post apartheid South African television", and the storyline cited as "the first interracial romance depicted on South African television." Of the experience Amato said, "It was wonderful to be part of the slow but healthy process that shifted people's attitudes." Her performance in Isidingo earned Amato an Avante for Best Actress in a Television Series.

In 2002, Amato was granted a United States Permanent Resident Card as an "Alien of Extraordinary Ability" in the arts and emigrated to the United States. After appearing in a 2002 episode of the HBO series Sex and the City, she played several leading roles with the Guthrie Theater in Minneapolis, Minnesota between 2003 and 2005. Since 2009 Amato has guest starred in several U.S. TV series. Amato portrays Delia Alexander in the 2015 PlayStation Network series Powers.

Amato appeared in the original Broadway production of Tom Stoppard's Tony Award-winning trio of plays The Coast of Utopia (2006–07), as well as the 2013–14 Broadway revival of Shakespeare's Macbeth. She also understudied the roles of Hannah Jarvis and Lady Croom in the 2011 Broadway revival of Stoppard's Arcadia. Off-Broadway, Amato has appeared in Bill Irwin's Mr. Fox: A Rumination (2004), and as Emma in Trumpery (2007). She later costarred as Calantha in The Broken Heart in 2012, and played the leading role of Olga Knipper in Neva in 2013. Amato also starred as Amanda in a production of Noël Coward's Private Lives directed by Maria Aitken, first presented in 2012 at the Huntington Theatre Company in Boston, and again in 2014 at the Shakespeare Theatre Company's Lansburgh Theatre in Washington, D. C. In 2014 she also portrayed Regan in the Theatre for a New Audience production of King Lear in New York.

Amato has narrated over 40 audiobooks, including most of the historical novels in the Cousins' War series written by Philippa Gregory, and Charles Stross' 2008 science fiction novel Saturn's Children. She also voiced the 2006 gothic novel The Thirteenth Tale by Diane Setterfield, which had risen to No. 1 on The New York Times Best Seller list in its second week of publication.

Television

Film

Theatre

Selected audiobooks

Acclaim
Charles Isherwood of The New York Times wrote in his review of 2012's The Broken Heart that "Amato exudes imperial grandeur as Calantha", and Andy Propst of TheaterMania noted that "audiences will also find themselves intrigued by Amato's warmly imperious turn as the Spartan princess." In 2013 Isherwood called the cast of Neva "terrifically good", noting Amato to be "captivating from the opening moments" and writing that she "manages to make Olga's self-dramatizing histrionics absurdly funny, but also tinged with real pathos." In 2012 The Boston Globe called Amato and her costar James Waterston "just about perfect" in their roles as Amanda and Elyot in Private Lives, praising their "style, dexterity, subtlety, and sizzling chemistry." The review went on to say that "Amato cuts a regal, soignée figure — she can wring a laugh out of a single word, like 'inveterate' — but she is also skilled at physical comedy." BroadwayWorld.com called Amato and Waterston "an unparalleled pair" in 2014, adding that "Amato is both grit and glamour, portraying a character that is brusque for her time, but immense fun to watch." Ben Brantley of The New York Times called Amato's 2014 performance in King Lear "superb", and the Brooklyn Daily Eagle called her Regan "icily alluring". Joe Dziemianowicz of the New York Daily News wrote of the performance that "as second-born Regan, Bianca Amato's clipped and exasperated speech and body language suggest a woman who's up to her eyeballs in middle-child neglect. She's Jan Brady in period clothes."

Awards
Amato won the Vita Award for Best Newcomer for Under Milk Wood and the Fleur du Cap Theatre Award for Best Supporting Actress for Greek, both performed at the Baxter Theatre in Cape Town, South Africa. Her portrayal of Philippa De Villiers on Isidingo earned her an Avante for Best Actress in a Television Series and a Duku Duku Award for South Africa's Most Popular Actress. She later won the Star Tribune Award for best performance of 2004 for playing Eliza Doolittle in Pygmalion at the Guthrie Theater in Minneapolis, Minnesota. Her performance in Private Lives earned her an Elliot Norton Award for Outstanding Actress in 2013, and the Shakespeare Theatre Company's Emery Battis Award in 2014. Amato was also nominated for a 2013 Best Actress IRNE Award for Private Lives.

Amato has received nine AudioFile Earphones Awards and two Audie Awards for her audiobook performances.

Personal life
Amato was born in Cape Town, South Africa. The daughter of "politically active parents", she "grew up keenly aware of the 'deep, deep troubles' of apartheid", and as a teen was a member of a left-wing organization called Pupils Awareness and Action Group. Amato graduated from the University of Cape Town.

References

External links
 
 
 

Living people
South African soap opera actresses
South African stage actresses
South African television actresses
South African voice actresses
Year of birth missing (living people)
Audiobook narrators
20th-century South African actresses
21st-century South African actresses
University of Cape Town alumni